Mossie Lyons is an Irish Gaelic football half-back who plays with the Castleisland Desmonds club side, and formerly with the Kerry county team.

Playing career
Lyons was first selected for the Kerry senior team in 2000, after playing for the county in the All-Ireland Minor Football Championship and All-Ireland Under-21 Football Championship. He won a number of inter-county All-Ireland Senior Football Championships as a substitute (Kerry winning in 2000, 2004, 2006 and 2007), but never established himself in the half-back line, with a number of very talented footballers like Séamus Moynihan and Tomás Ó Sé occupying the starting spots.  He retired after winning the 2007 All-Ireland championship with Kerry.

References

External links
 http://www.kerrygaa.ie/index.php?option=com_content&task=view&id=36&Itemid=64

Year of birth missing (living people)
Living people
Castleisland Gaelic footballers
Kerry inter-county Gaelic footballers